The McBride-Sims Garage at 600 N. State St. in Orem, Utah is a brick building built in c.1920, in what is termed Early Commercial architecture.  It has also been known as Big John's Country Store.  It was listed on the National Register of Historic Places in 1998.

References

Commercial buildings on the National Register of Historic Places in Utah
Buildings designated early commercial in the National Register of Historic Places
Commercial buildings completed in 1920
National Register of Historic Places in Orem, Utah